Stowaway is a 2021 science fiction thriller drama film directed by Joe Penna, who co-wrote the screenplay with Ryan Morrison. The film stars Anna Kendrick, Daniel Dae Kim, Shamier Anderson, and Toni Collette. A co-production of the United States and Germany, it premiered on Netflix in select countries on April 22, 2021.

Plot
The crew of MTS-42, a two-year mission to Mars, consists of Mission Commander Marina Barnett, biologist David Kim, and medical researcher Zoe Levenson. After taking off from Earth, the upper stage of their launch vehicle is connected by 450 meter long tethers to the ship's main hull, acting as a counterweight for inertia-based artificial gravity.

Shortly after takeoff, Barnett discovers launch support engineer Michael Adams, an accidental stowaway, unconscious between two modules, entangled with a device that scrubs carbon dioxide from the air on the ship. As he falls, the device is inadvertently destroyed.

The crew is forced to use emergency lithium hydroxide canisters to scrub  from the air. Unfortunately, the canisters cannot sustain the extra load. Barnett orders David to immediately cultivate his algae experiment on the ship, rather than at the Martian colony, as planned. Only half of the algae survive, providing just enough oxygen for a third crew member. Without another oxygen supply, the crew of four will asphyxiate weeks before reaching Mars.

Barnett asks mission control for a solution that will save all four passengers, but the only option—an untested EVA (spacewalk) to climb the tethers and recover liquid oxygen from the spent upper stage rocket—is deemed too risky. Barnett and David begin to come to terms with sacrificing Michael, but Zoe convinces them to wait ten days for mission control to think of another solution.

After three days, David breaks rank to explain the situation to Michael, offering him a painless lethal injection. Michael nearly takes his own life, but Zoe stops him and convinces him to hold out for a while longer. She insists on climbing the tethers to retrieve the liquid oxygen. David reveals that the rest of the algae has died, leaving only enough oxygen for two. Now facing the death of two passengers, he agrees to join her on the climb.

Zoe and David perform the EVA and jury rig a solution to fill two cylinders, which is enough to sustain two more passengers. Deadly radiation from a high-energy solar flare—coronal mass ejection—forces them to leave one of the cylinders behind. They make it back to the ship, but due to a critical equipment failure, the single oxygen cylinder is lost.

After regrouping, they realize that the large tank continues to leak oxygen due to the improvised connection, and that if one person exposes themselves to the lethal radiation to retrieve the cylinder left behind on the first attempt, the other three can survive. Marina must survive to pilot the ship, but the other three all volunteer to make the sacrifice.

As Michael is untrained and both he and David have families back home, Zoe ultimately insists on doing it herself. She manages to fill and return the cylinder to the ship before succumbing to radiation poisoning. She spends her final moments outside the ship, gazing at a faint Mars amongst the stars.

Cast
 Anna Kendrick as Zoe Levenson, the ship's doctor
 Toni Collette as Marina Barnett, the ship commander
 Daniel Dae Kim as David Kim, the ship's biologist
 Shamier Anderson as Michael Adams, a launch support engineer and the eponymous stowaway

Production
In October 2018, it was announced Anna Kendrick was cast to appear in Joe Penna's next film, starring as a medical researcher. In January 2019, Toni Collette was added to the cast, in the role of the ship commander. In May, Shamier Anderson was cast as the titular stowaway, and Daniel Dae Kim joined as the ship's biologist.

Filming began on June 11, 2019, in Cologne and Munich and wrapped after 30 days. YouTuber and science communicator Scott Manley was a consultant for the film.

Release
In November 2018, Sony Pictures Worldwide Acquisitions acquired international distribution rights to the film, excluding the United States. In December 2020, Netflix acquired distribution rights to the film, acquiring territories previously purchased by Sony, with Amazon Prime Video set to distribute in Canada. The film released on April 22, 2021, except for German-speaking countries where the Netflix release will follow showings in cinemas which will happen at an indeterminate time due to the ongoing pandemic.

Reception
On review aggregator website Rotten Tomatoes, Stowaway holds an approval rating of 76% based on 109 reviews, with an average rating of 6.50/10. The site's critics consensus reads, "Pacing problems prevent Stowaway from fully engaging, but it's distinguished by its thoughtful, well-acted approach to a story built on an excruciating moral dilemma." Metacritic assigned the film a weighted average score of 63 out of 100 based on 24 critics, indicating "generally favorable reviews".

See also
 "Breaking Strain", 1949 Arthur C. Clarke short story
 "The Cold Equations", 1954 Tom Godwin short story

References

External links
 
 
 

2021 films
2021 thriller drama films
2021 science fiction films
2020s science fiction drama films
2020s science fiction thriller films
2020s survival films
2020s English-language films
American thriller drama films
American science fiction drama films
American science fiction thriller films
American space adventure films
American survival films
German thriller drama films
German science fiction drama films
German science fiction thriller films
English-language German films
English-language Netflix original films
Films about astronauts
Films set on spacecraft
Films set in outer space
Films shot in Cologne
Films shot at Bavaria Studios
Mars in film
Wild Bunch (company) films
2020s American films